Kim Un-hyang ( or  ; born 21 October 1991 in Pyeonganbuk-do) is a North Korean diver. Her main events are 10m platform and 10m synchronized platform. 

At the 2008 Summer Olympics, she competed in the 10 m platform and the synchronised 10 m platform, with Choe Kum-Hui.

She competed in the 10 metre platform event at the 2012 Summer Olympics. 

She competed for the 2014 Asian Games at both women's 10m platform and synchronized platform. At the 2014 Asian Games,  She won the silver medal of women's 10m synchronized platform with her partner Song Nam Hyang and the bronze medal of the individual event. 

At the 2015 World Aquatics Championships, she won the bronze medal of women's 10m synchronized platform with her partner Song Nam Hyang. 

She competed in the women's 10 metre platform event at the 2016 Olympics in Rio de Janeiro, coming seventh overall.

References

North Korean female divers
Divers at the 2012 Summer Olympics
Olympic divers of North Korea
1991 births
Living people
Asian Games medalists in diving
Divers at the 2010 Asian Games
Divers at the 2014 Asian Games
Divers at the 2016 Summer Olympics
World Aquatics Championships medalists in diving
Asian Games silver medalists for North Korea
Asian Games bronze medalists for North Korea
Medalists at the 2010 Asian Games
Medalists at the 2014 Asian Games
Universiade medalists in diving
Universiade gold medalists for North Korea
Universiade silver medalists for North Korea
Medalists at the 2017 Summer Universiade
Medalists at the 2009 Summer Universiade

Divers at the 2008 Summer Olympics
21st-century North Korean women